George Vid Tomashevich (Vocin, Kingdom of Yugoslavia, 3 March 1927 – Berkeley, California,  3 December 2009) was an eminent Serbian poet, writer and professor of anthropology in the United States of America. As a scholar of universal erudition, Professor Emeritus of Anthropology at State University of New York, College at Buffalo.

Tomashevich belonged to a distinguished Serbian family in Slavonia which had taken refuge in Belgrade from the World War II persecution of Serbs in Croatia.

He was a liberal-minded man, both in politics and religion, and an enthusiastic supporter of popular education. He took interest in the struggle of the Serbs for independence and strongly favoured the establishment of a monarchy (along British lines) which came about in 2002 when Crown Prince Alexander Karageogević decided to return home to his ancestral roots. Tomashevich was a member of Alexander, Crown Prince of Yugoslavia’s Privy Council. He was also a member of The Serbian Heritage Academy of Canada, based in Toronto, the Serbian Academy of Sciences and Arts (SANU) in Belgrade, and the Nikola Tesla Memorial Society of New York.

He came to the United States shortly after World War II. He received his bachelor's degree in sociology from Roosevelt University and his master's and doctoral degrees in anthropology from the University of Chicago. He came to Buffalo in 1968 to teach anthropology at Buffalo State College and retired in 1995.

His academic career included many books, articles and public lectures, as well as contributions to the fields of Anthropology, Sociology, History, Philosophy, Philosophy of History, History of Philosophy and Science, Comparative Religion, Mythology, Linguistics, Folklore and Literature. As a scholar and poet, he wrote movingly on universal human topics, as well as on achievements of Serbian art, history and culture.

Works (partial list)
His works include:
 The Millenniad (2006)
 Songs of Serbia (2002)
 Portraite of Serbian Achievers (2000)
 Continuity and Change in Serbian Civilization in the Wake of the Ottoman Conquest (1957)
 Prizme uma i crca (1985)
 The World as a Metaphor (1997)
 Co-authored with Sofija Škorić: Saint Sava, Patron of Serbia (1986)

References 

Serbian classical scholars
Serbian male poets
Serbian anthropologists
American people of Serbian descent
1927 births
2009 deaths
20th-century anthropologists